Liberty High School is a public high school in Liberty Township, just north of Youngstown, Ohio.  It is the only high school in the Liberty Local School District.

Athletics

Liberty High School has won state championships in the following sports:
 Boys cross country – 1975
 Girls track and field – 1978

WLHS-TV3
WLHS-TV3 was the closed circuit television station that broadcast throughout the high school. Regular shows included the "Morning Update" and the "Afternoon Update". WLHS also broadcast full coverage of special events such as pep rallies, student voting and fundraisers. WLHS-TV3 was created and built by student Dave Malkoff in 1993. The station was funded by a grant from the Liberty Local School District. Transmission was provided by utilizing equipment installed by Whittle Communications for their "Channel One" program.

Notable alumni
 Amy Acton, director of the Ohio Department of Health
 Jerry DePizzo, musician in O.A.R.
 Bob DiPiero, American country music song writer
 Bradley Fletcher, professional football player in the National Football League (NFL)
 Dave Malkoff, television correspondent with The Weather Channel
 Fitzgerald Toussaint, professional football player in the NFL
 Jimmy Weller III, racecar driver

References

External links
 

High schools in Trumbull County, Ohio
Public high schools in Ohio